Lucas Martins (born 11 November 1988) is a Brazilian mixed martial artist who competes in the lightweight division of Brave Combat Federation, where he is a former interim lightweight champion. A professional mixed martial artist since 2011, Martins has also competed in the Ultimate Fighting Championship.

Mixed martial arts career

Early career
Martins started his MMA career in 2011; before that he competed in muay thai, achieving a 34–2 record. He fought only for Brazilian-based promotions such as Jungle Fight and MMA Rocks. With a record of twelve wins and no losses, Martins signed with the UFC.

Lucas Martins is managed by Wade Hampel of Big Fight Management.

Ultimate Fighting Championship
Martins made his promotional debut on short notice, replacing an injured Justin Salas against Edson Barboza on 19 January 2013 at UFC on FX: Belfort vs. Bisping. Martins had his first defeat due to TKO (retirement) in the first round.

Martins faced Jeremy Larsen, a contestant of The Ultimate Fighter: Live, on 18 May 2013, at UFC on FX: Belfort vs. Rockhold. Despite taking a significant amount of damage in the first two rounds, Martins knocked Larsen out early in the third round. The performance earned both participants Fight of the Night honors.

Martins next dropped from lightweight to bantamweight and faced promotional newcomer Junior Hernandez on 4 September 2013, at UFC Fight Night: Teixeira vs. Bader. He won the fight via technical submission in the first round.

Martins was expected to face Johnny Eduardo on 9 November 2013, at UFC Fight Night 32. However, both fighters were removed from the card due to injury.

Martins was expected to face Bryan Caraway on 22 February 2014, at UFC 170.  However, Caraway pulled out of the bout citing and injury and was replaced by UFC newcomer Aljamain Sterling.

Martins was expected to face Jim Alers in a featherweight bout on 16 July 2014, at UFC Fight Night 45.  However, Alers pulled out of the bout citing injury and was replaced by Alex White.  Martins won the back and forth fight via knockout in the third round. The win also earned him his first Performance of the Night bonus award.

Martins faced Darren Elkins on 25 October 2014, at UFC 179. Elkins defeated Martins via split decision.

Martins faced Mirsad Bektić on 30 May 2015, at UFC Fight Night 67, replacing Renato Moicano. He lost the fight via TKO in the second round.

Martins faced Robert Whiteford on 10 April 2016, at UFC Fight Night 86. Martins won the fight via split decision. Subsequently, the UFC elected not to renew Martin's contract – allowing him to sign elsewhere.

Brave CF
After racking a couple of wins in Brazil's regional circuit, Martins signed with Brave Combat Federation. In the promotional debut Martins faced Fabian Galvan at Brave CF 3 and won the bout via Brabo choke in the second round.

On 13 April 2018, Martins faced Luan Santiago Carvalho for the interim lightweight championship. Martins was behind in the scorecards coming into the fifth and final round. In the final seconds of the round, Santiago dislocated his elbow when he was taken down by Martins and couldn't continue. Martins became a free agent after fighting out his two-fight contract with Brave, but elected to rapidly sign a new, five-fight contract with the organization.

Martins faced Abdul-Kareem Al-Selwady for the undisputed lightweight championship at Brave CF 18 on 16 November 2018. Martins injured his left leg when he was taken down by Al-Selwady in the first round and referee stopped the fight.

On 25 July 2019, Martins was defeated by Bubba Jenkins at Brave 24 by TKO at 2:48 of the first round by way of unanswered strikes. Jenkins retained the Brave CF Featherweight Championship.

Martins was next scheduled to face Felipe Silva at Brave CF 35 on 28 March 2020, but Silva withdrew from the bout and was replaced with Abdul-Rakhman Makhaziev. However, the event has been postponed until a to-be-determined date due to the COVID-19 pandemic

Martins was next expected to face Luan Santiago in a rematch at Brave CF 41 on 17 September 2020. However, Martins was forced to withdraw due to an injury and the bout was scrapped.

Martins was scheduled to face Marcel Grabinski on 4 June 2021 at Brave CF 51. Hoewever, Grabinski has to pull out from the fight due to medical condition. The bout has been called off.

Martins scheduled again to face Marcel Grabinski on 21 August 2021 at Brave CF 53. According to BRAVE CF officials, Grabinski was forced to withdraw from the rescheduled bout a little bit less than week prior to the event due to Covid-19 protocols. Marcel hadn’t traveled to Kazakhstan and was  replaced by local standout Olzhas Eskaraev. In an upset, Martins lost the bout via rear-naked choke in the second round.

Personal life 
Martins owns a gym, Capital da Luta, in São Paulo.

Championships and accomplishments

Mixed martial arts
Ultimate Fighting Championship
Fight of the Night (One time) vs. Alex White
Performance of the Night (One time) vs. Jeremy Larsen

Mixed martial arts record

| Win
|align=center|21–6
|Henrique Marques
|TKO (punches)
|Brave CF 60
|
|align=center|1
|align=center|1:10
|Isa Town, Bahrain
| 
|-
| Loss
| align=center| 20–6
| Olzhas Eskaraev
| Submission (rear-naked choke)
| Brave CF 53
| 
| align=center| 2
| align=center| 2:49
| Almaty, Kazakhstan
| 
|-
| Loss
| align=center| 20–5
| Bubba Jenkins
| TKO (punches)
| Brave CF 24
| 
| align=center| 1
| align=center| 2:48
| London, England
| 
|-
|Loss
|align=center|20–4
|Abdul-Kareem Al-Selwady
|TKO (leg injury)
|Brave CF 18
|
|align=center|1
|align=center|2:18
|Isa Town, Bahrain
|
|-
|Win
|align=center|20–3
|Luan Santiago Carvalho
|TKO (arm injury)
|Brave CF 11: Mineiro vs. Santiago
|
|align=center|5
|align=center|4:56
|Belo Horizonte, Brazil
|
|-
|Win
|align=center|19–3
|Fabian Galvan
|Submission (Brabo Choke)
|Brave CF 3: Battle in Brazil
|
|align=center|2
|align=center|4:42
|São José dos Pinhais, Brazil
|
|-
|Win
|align=center|18–3
|Gilson Lomanto
|Submission (anaconda choke)
|Thunder Fight 9: Lomanto vs. Mineiro
|
|align=center|1
|align=center|2:24
|São Paulo, Brazil
|
|-
|Win
|align=center|17–3
|Sergio Leal
|Decision (unanimous)
|Thunder Fight 8: Silverio vs. Nunes
|
|align=center|3
|align=center|5:00
|São Paulo, Brazil
|
|-
|Win
|align=center|16–3
|Robert Whiteford
|Decision (split)
|UFC Fight Night: Rothwell vs. dos Santos
|
|align=center|3
|align=center|5:00
|Zagreb, Croatia
|
|-
|Loss
|align=center|15–3
|Mirsad Bektić
|TKO (punches)
|UFC Fight Night: Condit vs. Alves
|
|align=center|2
|align=center|0:30
|Goiânia, Brazil
|
|-
|Loss
|align=center|15–2
|Darren Elkins
|Decision (split)
|UFC 179
|
|align=center|3
|align=center|5:00
|Rio de Janeiro, Brazil
|
|-
|Win
|align=center|15–1
|Alex White
|KO (punches)
|UFC Fight Night: Cowboy vs. Miller
|
|align=center|3
|align=center|2:08
|Atlantic City, New Jersey, United States
|
|-
|Win
|align=center|14–1
|Junior Hernandez
|Technical Submission (rear-naked choke)
|UFC Fight Night: Teixeira vs. Bader
|
|align=center|1
|align=center|1:10
|Belo Horizonte, Brazil
|
|-
|Win
|align=center|13–1
|Jeremy Larsen
|KO (punch)
|UFC on FX: Belfort vs. Rockhold
|
|align=center|3
|align=center|0:13
|Jaraguá do Sul, Brazil
|
|-
|Loss
|align=center|12–1
|Edson Barboza
| TKO (punches)
|UFC on FX: Belfort vs. Bisping
|
|align=center|1
|align=center|2:38
|São Paulo, Brazil
|
|-
|Win
|align=center|12–0
|Oberdan Vieira 
|KO (head kick)
|Jungle Fight 46
|
|align=center|2
|align=center|3:03
|São Paulo, Brazil
|
|-
|Win
|align=center|11–0
|Thiago Sampaio
|Submission (rear-naked choke)
|MMA Rocks
|
|align=center|1
|align=center|0:43
|São Paulo, Brazil
|
|-
|Win
|align=center|10–0
|Jonatas Bernardo
|TKO (punches)
|Valiant Fighters Championship 11
|
|align=center|3
|align=center|1:16
|Ribeirão Preto, Brazil
|
|-
|Win
|align=center|9–0
|Carlos Eugênio
|TKO (punches)
|Warriors Fighting Championship 1
|
|align=center|1
|align=center|1:17
|Taubaté, Brazil
|
|-
|Win
|align=center|8–0
|João Paulo Melo
|TKO (body punches)
|Romani Fight Brasil 2: Night Fight Aldeia X
|
|align=center|2
|align=center|N/A
|São Paulo, Brazil
|
|-
|Win
|align=center|7–0
|Francisco Pinheiro 
|TKO (punches)
|Romani Fight Brasil 2: Night Fight Aldeia X
|
|align=center|1
|align=center|N/A
|São Paulo, Brazil
|
|-
|Win
|align=center|6–0
|Renê Alves
|Decision (unanimous)
|Jaula Fight 2
|
|align=center|3
|align=center|5:00
|Arcos, Brazil
|
|-
|Win
|align=center|5–0
|Dilson Júnior
|TKO (punches)
|Supremacia Fight: Duelo de Titãs
|
|align=center|1
|align=center|2:06
|Montes Claros, Brazil
|
|-
|Win
|align=center|4–0
|Washington Rodrigues
|Submission (punches)
|Fight Night Enjoy Drinking 3
|
|align=center|3
|align=center|3:14
|São Paulo, Brazil
|
|-
|Win
|align=center|3–0
|Luiz Felipe
|TKO (punches)
|OctoFight 5
|
|align=center|1
|align=center|2:28
|Divinópolis, Brazil
|
|-
|Win
|align=center|2–0
|Leonir Irineu 
|TKO (doctor stoppage)
|OctoFight 4: Duelo de Titãs
|
|align=center|2
|align=center|5:00
|Itaúna, Brazil
|
|-
|Win
|align=center|1–0
|Alex Hermogenes
|Submission (armbar)
|Qualifight
|
|align=center|1
|align=center|4:48
|Mogi das Cruzes, Brazil
|

See also
 List of current Brave CF fighters
 List of male mixed martial artists

References

External links
 Lucas Martins at Brave CF
 
 

1988 births
Living people
Brazilian male mixed martial artists
Bantamweight mixed martial artists
Lightweight mixed martial artists
Featherweight mixed martial artists
Mixed martial artists utilizing Muay Thai
Mixed martial artists utilizing Brazilian jiu-jitsu
Ultimate Fighting Championship male fighters
Brazilian practitioners of Brazilian jiu-jitsu
Brazilian Muay Thai practitioners
Sportspeople from Minas Gerais